Özkan Koçtürk (born 6 November 1974 in Braunschweig, Germany) is a retired Turkish-German footballer. He spent one season in the 2. Bundesliga with Eintracht Braunschweig, as well as four seasons in the Turkish Süper Lig with Fenerbahçe, Çanakkale Dardanelspor, and Altay S.K.

References

External links
Statistics at TFF.org

1974 births
Living people
Sportspeople from Braunschweig
German footballers
Turkish footballers
German people of Turkish descent
Eintracht Braunschweig players
Altay S.K. footballers
Fenerbahçe S.K. footballers
Association football forwards
Süper Lig players
2. Bundesliga players
Footballers from Lower Saxony